Civic Center station is a light rail station operated by Santa Clara Valley Transportation Authority.  The station is located in San Jose, California, on 1st Street just north of Mission Street. The station is located in and named after the Civic Center area where many city and county government buildings are located, including the County Administration Campus, San Jose Police Department, Santa Clara County Sheriff's Office, and Santa Clara County Superior Court. The station is served by the Blue and Green lines of the VTA Light Rail system.

References

External links 

 

Santa Clara Valley Transportation Authority light rail stations
Santa Clara Valley Transportation Authority bus stations
Railway stations in the United States opened in 1987
1987 establishments in California